The Lady Killer is a 1913 American silent short comedy film starring William Garwood, Victory Bateman, Florence Crawford, Howard Davies, Lamar Johnstone, and Anne Drew.

External links
 

1913 films
1913 comedy films
Silent American comedy films
American silent short films
American black-and-white films
1913 short films
American comedy short films
1910s American films